Stevensville is a small community in southern Ontario, Canada in the town of Fort Erie, most notable as the birthplace of Canadian entrepreneur James L. Kraft.

Economy
The centre of the community is the intersection of Stevensville Road and Main Street. Stevensville is home to several small shops and restaurants including Mae's Place, Scuttlebutt Tap & Eatery, Bertie Tire Centre, Lane's Restaurant, Stevensville Garden Gallery, etc. Construction companies like Gibbons Contracting, Circle P Paving, Peters Excavating, Niagara Industrial Maintenance, etc. Nomad Drum Cases, who manufactures cases for drummers, which are exported globally. Stevensville is also the home of EMD Music Inc's Canadian office, an international full line music distributor. Their head office is in Brussels, Belgium.

The community of Stevensville is also home to Safari Niagara, a  location featuring numerous exotic animals. Safari Niagara also has an outdoor amphitheater that hosts live concerts.

Geography
Situated a few kilometres north of Lake Erie, and a short drive from Niagara Falls, Stevensville is surrounded primarily by agricultural land. Much wildlife can be sighted throughout the rural sections. There are many opportunities to experience the outdoors in Stevensville. Black Creek runs through the area which is often used for kayaking and canoeing, with a boat launch at the end of Main Street.

Notable people
 James L. Kraft, inventor of processed cheese and founder of the multibillion-dollar J.L. Kraft & Bros. Company, which later became Kraft Foods Inc.
 Michael Fonfara, musician (blues, rock and pop keyboardist)
 Matt Thiessen, musician (Christian rock)
 Nick Weglarz, former professional baseball outfielder, played in the 2008 Summer Olympics

Other notable people to come out of here are NU ACHA D2 Captain and investor, Kenneth “Zac” Ricardo.

References

External links

Stevensville at Geographical Names of Canada

Neighbourhoods in Fort Erie, Ontario